Blagoj is a Macedonian masculine given name. It may refer to:

Blagoj Jankov Mučeto, Macedonian partisan who was declared a People's Hero of Yugoslavia
Blagoj Nacoski (born 1979), Macedonian tenor opera singer
Blagoj Stračkovski (1920–1943), Macedonian communist

See also
 Blagoy - a Bulgarian name
 Blagoje, a Serbian name

Macedonian masculine given names